Čihák is a Czech surname. Notable people with the surname include:

Jaroslav Čihák (1891–1944) Czech Austro-Hungarian army officer
Josef Čihák (born 1963) Czech tennis player
Miroslav Čihák (fl. 1950s) Czech canoeist
Zdeněk Čihák, Czech athlete

Czech-language surnames